Ratau is a community council located in the Maseru District of Lesotho. Its population in 2006 was 26,582.

Villages
The community of Ratau includes the villages of Ha Ino, Ha Kapa, Ha Kopano (Meeling), Ha Kubutu, Ha Lekhutle, Ha Lesaoana, Ha Lethena, Ha Maimane, Ha Majoro, Ha Makhabane, Ha Makhale, Ha Makopong, Ha Makotoko, Ha Mapale, Ha Masakale, Ha Masupha, Ha Masupha (Ha Motho-Motšoana), Ha Masupha (Pontšeng), Ha Matela, Ha Matjeke, Ha Matlangoane, Ha Moetsa, Ha Mofammere, Ha Moji, Ha Mokete, Ha Molengoane, Ha Mosoeu, Ha Mosotho, Ha Mosuoe, Ha Mothae, Ha Mothokho, Ha Motjoka, Ha Motleleng, Ha Mpao, Ha Mphuke, Ha Mpiti, Ha Nkhema, Ha Nkhema (Thoteng), Ha Nkokomohi, Ha Nqheku, Ha Nqosa, Ha Ntainyane, Ha Ntsi, Ha Phaloane, Ha Raanye, Ha Rabotsoa, Ha Rachere, Ha Ralejoe, Ha Ramakabatane, Ha Ramakhaba, Ha Ramotšoane, Ha Ramotšoane (Sekhutlong), Ha Rankota, Ha Ratau, Ha Sechaba, Ha Seeiso, Ha Sekantši, Ha Sekete, Ha Seoehlana, Ha Sephoko, Ha Tieli, Ha Tjopa, Ha Tsoili, Ha Tumahole, Khoiti-ntle, Kotopeng, Maemeng, Makatseng, Malekokoana, Manganeng, Mohlaka-oa-tuka, Moreneng, Motjokeng, Motse-mocha, Ponoane, Sekhutlong, Takalatsa, Thaha-lia-Tloka, Thoteng and Toll Gate.

References

External links
 Google map of community villages

Populated places in Maseru District